Churchill Ettinger (May 10, 1903 – March 4, 1984) was an American painter. His work was part of the painting event in the art competition at the 1936 Summer Olympics.

References

1903 births
1984 deaths
20th-century American painters
American male painters
Artists from New Jersey
Olympic competitors in art competitions
People from Haworth, New Jersey
20th-century American male artists